Hohoe Municipal is one of the 25 administrative districts of the Volta Region of Ghana.  It was carved out of the former Kpando District. It was established by the Legislative Instrument (L.I. 2072) of 2012. The Municipality has a total land area of 1,172 km2, which is 5.6 per cent of the land area of the region.  It shares borders with the Republic of Togo on the east, forming part of Ghana's international border; on the southeast by the Afadzato district and southwest by Kpando Municipality; on the north with Jasikan district; and on the northwest with the Biakoye districts. Its capital, Hohoe, is about 78 km from Ho, the regional capital and 220 km from Accra, the national capital. The population of Hohoe Municipality, according to the 2010 Population and Housing Census, is 167,016 representing 7.9 per cent of the total population of the Volta Region. It comprises 52.1 per cent females and 47.9 percent males.

Major areas 
Alavanyo-Dzogbedze, Alavanyo-Deme, Alavanyo Agorme, Alavanyo-Kpeme, Alavanyo-Wudidi, Alavanyo-Agorxoe, Alavanyo-Abehenase, Gbi-Bla, Gbi-Kpeme, Gbi-Godenu Gbi-Abansi, Gbi-Wegbe, Kpoeta, Gbi-Atabu, Gbi-Kledzo, Gborxome, Blave, Kitikpa, Lowcost, Segbedeme, Likpe, Lolobi, Bayika, Fodome, Torkorni.

Education 
There are many private and public basic schools in Hohoe. A list of educational institutions in Hohoe are as follows:

Tertiary institutions 

 University of Health and Allied Sciences
 St. Theresa's Training College
 St. Francis College of Education
 Hohoe Midwifery Training College

Secondary education 

 Hohoe EP Senior High School.
 Likpe Senior High School
 Alavanyo Senior High Technical School
 Akpafu Senior High Technical School
 Agate Senior High School
 Afadjato Senior High Technical School
St. Mary's Seminary/Senior High School

Tourism   
The Hohoe Municipality is a home of tourism potential capable of transforming its economy, as well as its overall contribution to national income when fully harnessed. It has beautiful landscapes, numerous eco-tourism sites that make it one of the most important tourist areas in the country.  The Hohoe Municipality has the following marked tourism features:

i. The highest peak in Ghana Mount Afadja (Afadjato) located between Liati Wote and Gbledi communities

ii. The highest waterfall in West Africa – Wli Waterfall located at Wli.

iii. Tsatsadu Waterfall located at Alavanyo

iv. Tagbo Waterfall at Liati Wote

v. Wadjakli Waterfall located at Likpe Todome

vi. The most wonderful ancient old iron mines at Akpafu –Todzi  

vii. The four ancestral caves located at Likpe-Todome

References

External links
 Ghana-Pedia webpage – Hohoe
 Ghana Ministry of Food & Agriculture

Populated places in the Volta Region
Education in Volta Region